This is a list of the mammal species recorded in the Democratic Republic of the Congo. Of the mammal species in the Democratic Republic of the Congo, two are critically endangered, six are endangered, twenty-one are vulnerable, and thirty-five are near threatened.

The following tags are used to highlight each species' conservation status as assessed by the International Union for Conservation of Nature:

Some species were assessed using an earlier set of criteria. Species assessed using this system have the following instead of near threatened and least concern categories:

Order: Afrosoricida (tenrecs and golden moles) 
The order Afrosoricida contains the golden moles of southern Africa and the tenrecs of Madagascar and Africa, two families of small mammals that were traditionally part of the order Insectivora.

Family: Tenrecidae (tenrecs)
Subfamily: Potamogalinae
Genus: Micropotamogale
 Ruwenzori otter shrew, Micropotamogale ruwenzorii NT
Genus: Potamogale
 Giant otter shrew, Potamogale velox LC
Family: Chrysochloridae
Subfamily: Chrysochlorinae
Genus: Chrysochloris
 Stuhlmann's golden mole, Chrysochloris stuhlmanni LC
Subfamily: Amblysominae
Genus: Calcochloris
 Congo golden mole, Calcochloris leucorhinus DD

Order: Macroscelidea (elephant shrews) 
Often called sengi, the elephant shrews or jumping shrews are native to southern Africa. Their common English name derives from their elongated flexible snout and their resemblance to the true shrews.

Family: Macroscelididae (elephant shrews)
Genus: Elephantulus
 Short-snouted elephant shrew, Elephantulus brachyrhynchus LC
 Dusky-footed elephant shrew, Elephantulus fuscipes DD
Genus: Petrodromus
 Four-toed elephant shrew, Petrodromus tetradactylus LC
Genus: Rhynchocyon
 Checkered elephant shrew, Rhynchocyon cirnei NT

Order: Tubulidentata (aardvarks) 

The order Tubulidentata consists of a single species, the aardvark. Tubulidentata are characterised by their teeth which lack a pulp cavity and form thin tubes which are continuously worn down and replaced.

Family: Orycteropodidae
Genus: Orycteropus
 Aardvark, O. afer

Order: Hyracoidea (hyraxes) 

The hyraxes are any of four species of fairly small, thickset, herbivorous mammals in the order Hyracoidea. About the size of a domestic cat they are well-furred, with rounded bodies and a stumpy tail. They are native to Africa and the Middle East.

Family: Procaviidae (hyraxes)
Genus: Dendrohyrax
 Southern tree hyrax, Dendrohyrax arboreus LC
 Western tree hyrax, Dendrohyrax dorsalis LC
Genus: Heterohyrax
 Yellow-spotted rock hyrax, Heterohyrax brucei LC
Genus: Procavia
 Cape hyrax, Procavia capensis LC

Order: Proboscidea (elephants) 

The elephants comprise three living species and are the largest living land animals.

Family: Elephantidae (elephants)
Genus: Loxodonta
African bush elephant, L. africana 
African forest elephant, L. cyclotis

Order: Sirenia (manatees and dugongs) 
Sirenia is an order of fully aquatic, herbivorous mammals that inhabit rivers, estuaries, coastal marine waters, swamps, and marine wetlands. All four species are endangered.

Family: Trichechidae
Genus: Trichechus
 African manatee, T. senegalensis

Order: Primates 

The order Primates contains humans and their closest relatives: lemurs, lorisoids, tarsiers, monkeys, and apes.

Suborder: Strepsirrhini
Infraorder: Lemuriformes
Superfamily: Lorisoidea
Family: Lorisidae (lorises, bushbabies)
Genus: Arctocebus
 Golden angwantibo, Arctocebus aureus LC
Genus: Perodicticus
 Potto, Perodicticus potto LC
Family: Galagidae
Genus: Galagoides
 Prince Demidoff's bushbaby, Galagoides demidovii LC
 Thomas's bushbaby, Galagoides thomasi LC
Genus: Galago
 Dusky bushbaby, Galago matschiei LC
 Mohol bushbaby, Galago moholi LC
 Senegal bushbaby, Galago senegalensis LC
Genus: Otolemur
 Brown greater galago, Otolemur crassicaudatus LC
Genus: Euoticus
 Southern needle-clawed bushbaby, Euoticus elegantulus LC
Suborder: Haplorhini
Infraorder: Simiiformes
Parvorder: Catarrhini
Superfamily: Cercopithecoidea
Family: Cercopithecidae (Old World monkeys)
Genus: Allenopithecus
 Allen's swamp monkey, Allenopithecus nigroviridis
Genus: Miopithecus
 Angolan talapoin, Miopithecus talapoin
 Gabon talapoin, Miopithecus ogouensis
Genus: Erythrocebus
 Patas monkey, Erythrocebus patas
Genus: Chlorocebus
 Tantalus monkey, Chlorocebus tantalus
 Vervet monkey, Chlorocebus pygerythrus
 Malbrouck, Chlorocebus cynosuros
Genus: Cercopithecus
 Red-tailed monkey, Cercopithecus ascanius
 Moustached guenon, Cercopithecus cephus
 Dryas monkey, Cercopithecus dryas DD
 Hamlyn's monkey, Cercopithecus hamlyni
 L'Hoest's monkey, Cercopithecus lhoesti
 Blue monkey, Cercopithecus mitis
 De Brazza's monkey, Cercopithecus neglectus
 Greater spot-nosed monkey, Cercopithecus nictitans
 Crowned guenon, Cercopithecus pogonias
 Lesula, Cercopithecus lomamiensis
Genus: Lophocebus
 Grey-cheeked mangabey, Lophocebus albigena
 Black crested mangabey, Lophocebus aterrimus
Genus: Papio
 Olive baboon, Papio anubis LC
 Yellow baboon, Papio cynocephalus
Subfamily: Colobinae
Genus: Colobus
 Angola colobus, Colobus angolensis
 Mantled guereza, Colobus guereza
Superfamily: Hominoidea
Family: Hominidae (great apes)
Subfamily: Homininae
Tribe: Gorillini
Genus: Gorilla
 Mountain gorilla, Gorilla beringei beringei EN
 Eastern lowland gorilla, Gorilla beringei graueri CE
 Western lowland gorilla, Gorilla gorilla gorilla CE
Tribe: Panini
Genus: Pan
 Bonobo, Pan paniscus EN
 Common chimpanzee, Pan troglodytes EN

Order: Rodentia (rodents) 

Rodents make up the largest order of mammals, with over 40% of mammalian species. They have two incisors in the upper and lower jaw which grow continually and must be kept short by gnawing.

Suborder: Hystricognathi
Family: Bathyergidae
Genus: Cryptomys
 Bocage's mole-rat, Cryptomys bocagei DD
 Mechow's mole-rat, Cryptomys mechowi LC
 Ochre mole-rat, Cryptomys ochraceocinereus DD
Genus: Heliophobius
 Silvery mole-rat, Heliophobius argenteocinereus LC
Family: Hystricidae (Old World porcupines)
Genus: Atherurus
 African brush-tailed porcupine, Atherurus africanus LC
Genus: Hystrix
 Cape porcupine, Hystrix africaeaustralis LC
 Crested porcupine, Hystrix cristata LC
Family: Thryonomyidae (cane rats)
Genus: Thryonomys
 Lesser cane rat, Thryonomys gregorianus LC
 Greater cane rat, Thryonomys swinderianus LC
Suborder: Sciurognathi
Family: Anomaluridae
Subfamily: Anomalurinae
Genus: Anomalurus
 Lord Derby's scaly-tailed squirrel, Anomalurus derbianus LC
 Dwarf scaly-tailed squirrel, Anomalurus pusillus LC
Genus: Anomalurops
 Beecroft's scaly-tailed squirrel, Anomalurops beecrofti LC
Subfamily: Zenkerellinae
Genus: Idiurus
 Long-eared flying mouse, Idiurus macrotis LC
 Flying mouse, Idiurus zenkeri DD
Family: Pedetidae (spring hare)
Genus: Pedetes
 Springhare, Pedetes capensis LC
Family: Sciuridae (squirrels)
Subfamily: Xerinae
Tribe: Xerini
Genus: Xerus
 Striped ground squirrel, Xerus erythropus LC
Tribe: Protoxerini
Genus: Funisciurus
 Thomas's rope squirrel, Funisciurus anerythrus DD
 Lunda rope squirrel, Funisciurus bayonii DD
 Carruther's mountain squirrel, Funisciurus carruthersi LC
 Congo rope squirrel, Funisciurus congicus LC
 Ribboned rope squirrel, Funisciurus lemniscatus DD
 Fire-footed rope squirrel, Funisciurus pyrropus LC
Genus: Heliosciurus
 Gambian sun squirrel, Heliosciurus gambianus LC
 Red-legged sun squirrel, Heliosciurus rufobrachium LC
 Ruwenzori sun squirrel, Heliosciurus ruwenzorii LC
Genus: Paraxerus
 Alexander's bush squirrel, Paraxerus alexandri LC
 Boehm's bush squirrel, Paraxerus boehmi LC
 Smith's bush squirrel, Paraxerus cepapi LC
 Green bush squirrel, Paraxerus poensis LC
Genus: Protoxerus
 Forest giant squirrel, Protoxerus stangeri LC
Family: Gliridae (dormice)
Subfamily: Graphiurinae
Genus: Graphiurus
 Christy's dormouse, Graphiurus christyi DD
 Lorrain dormouse, Graphiurus lorraineus LC
 Monard's dormouse, Graphiurus monardi DD
 Kellen's dormouse, Graphiurus kelleni LC
 Silent dormouse, Graphiurus surdus DD
Family: Spalacidae
Subfamily: Tachyoryctinae
Genus: Tachyoryctes
 Rwanda African mole-rat, Tachyoryctes ruandae LC
Family: Nesomyidae
Subfamily: Delanymyinae
Genus: Delanymys
 Delany's swamp mouse, Delanymys brooksi EN
Subfamily: Dendromurinae
Genus: Dendromus
 Montane African climbing mouse, Dendromus insignis LC
 Mount Kahuzi climbing mouse, Dendromus kahuziensis CR
 Kivu climbing mouse, Dendromus kivu LC
 Gray climbing mouse, Dendromus melanotis LC
 Brants's climbing mouse, Dendromus mesomelas LC
 Banana climbing mouse, Dendromus messorius LC
 Chestnut climbing mouse, Dendromus mystacalis LC
 Nyika climbing mouse, Dendromus nyikae LC
Genus: Steatomys
 Fat mouse, Steatomys pratensis LC
Subfamily: Cricetomyinae
Genus: Cricetomys
 Emin's pouched rat, Cricetomys emini LC
 Gambian pouched rat, Cricetomys gambianus LC
Genus: Saccostomus
 South African pouched mouse, Saccostomus campestris LC
Family: Muridae (mice, rats, voles, gerbils, hamsters, etc.)
Subfamily: Deomyinae
Genus: Acomys
 Spiny mouse, Acomys spinosissimus LC
Genus: Deomys
 Link rat, Deomys ferrugineus LC
Genus: Lophuromys
 Gray brush-furred rat, Lophuromys cinereus DD
 Yellow-spotted brush-furred rat, Lophuromys flavopunctatus LC
 Hutterer's brush-furred mouse, Lophuromys huttereri DD
 Yellow-bellied brush-furred rat, Lophuromys luteogaster LC
 Medium-tailed brush-furred rat, Lophuromys medicaudatus NT
 Fire-bellied brush-furred rat, Lophuromys nudicaudus LC
 Rahm's brush-furred rat, Lophuromys rahmi NT
 Rusty-bellied brush-furred rat, Lophuromys sikapusi LC
 Woosnam's brush-furred rat, Lophuromys woosnami LC
Genus: Uranomys
 Rudd's mouse, Uranomys ruddi LC
Subfamily: Otomyinae
Genus: Otomys
 Dent's vlei rat, Otomys denti NT
 Large vlei rat, Otomys maximus LC
 Tropical vlei rat, Otomys tropicalis LC
Subfamily: Gerbillinae
Genus: Tatera
 Boehm's gerbil, Tatera boehmi LC
 Kemp's gerbil, Tatera kempi LC
 Bushveld gerbil, Tatera leucogaster LC
 Savanna gerbil, Tatera valida LC
Genus: Taterillus
 Congo gerbil, Taterillus congicus LC
 Emin's gerbil, Taterillus emini LC
Subfamily: Murinae
Genus: Aethomys
 Bocage's rock rat, Aethomys bocagei LC
 Hinde's rock rat, Aethomys hindei LC
 Kaiser's rock rat, Aethomys kaiseri LC
 Nyika rock rat, Aethomys nyikae LC
Genus: Arvicanthis
 African grass rat, Arvicanthis niloticus LC
Genus: Colomys
 African wading rat, Colomys goslingi LC
Genus: Dasymys
 African marsh rat, Dasymys incomtus LC
 Montane shaggy rat, Dasymys montanus VU
Genus: Grammomys
 Woodland thicket rat, Grammomys dolichurus LC
 Forest thicket rat, Grammomys dryas NT
 Macmillan's thicket rat, Grammomys macmillani LC
 Shining thicket rat, Grammomys rutilans LC
Genus: Heimyscus
 African smoky mouse, Heimyscus fumosus LC
Genus: Hybomys
 Moon striped mouse, Hybomys lunaris VU
 Peters's striped mouse, Hybomys univittatus LC
Genus: Hylomyscus
 Beaded wood mouse, Hylomyscus aeta LC
 Allen's wood mouse, Hylomyscus alleni LC
 Montane wood mouse, Hylomyscus denniae LC
 Little wood mouse, Hylomyscus parvus LC
 Stella wood mouse, Hylomyscus stella LC
Genus: Lemniscomys
 Griselda's striped grass mouse, Lemniscomys griselda LC
 Buffoon striped grass mouse, Lemniscomys macculus LC
 Typical striped grass mouse, Lemniscomys striatus LC
 Heuglin's striped grass mouse, Lemniscomys zebra LC
Genus: Malacomys
 Big-eared swamp rat, Malacomys longipes LC
Genus: Mastomys
 Guinea multimammate mouse, Mastomys erythroleucus LC
 Natal multimammate mouse, Mastomys natalensis LC
Genus: Mus
 Toad mouse, Mus bufo LC
 Callewaert's mouse, Mus callewaerti DD
 African pygmy mouse, Mus minutoides LC
 Neave's mouse, Mus neavei DD
 Peters's mouse, Mus setulosus LC
 Thomas's pygmy mouse, Mus sorella LC
 Gray-bellied pygmy mouse, Mus triton LC
Genus: Mylomys
 African groove-toothed rat, Mylomys dybowskii LC
Genus: Myomyscus
 Angolan multimammate mouse, Myomyscus angolensis LC
Genus: Oenomys
 Common rufous-nosed rat, Oenomys hypoxanthus LC
Genus: Pelomys
 Bell groove-toothed swamp rat, Pelomys campanae LC
 Creek groove-toothed swamp rat, Pelomys fallax LC
 Least groove-toothed swamp rat, Pelomys minor LC
Genus: Praomys
 Jackson's soft-furred mouse, Praomys jacksoni LC
 Lukolela swamp rat, Praomys lukolelae LC
 Least soft-furred mouse, Praomys minor DD
 Misonne's soft-furred mouse, Praomys misonnei LC
 Muton's soft-furred mouse, Praomys mutoni NT
 Tullberg's soft-furred mouse, Praomys tullbergi LC
 Verschuren's swamp rat, Praomys verschureni NT
Genus: Rhabdomys
 Four-striped grass mouse, Rhabdomys pumilio LC
Genus: Stochomys
 Target rat, Stochomys longicaudatus LC
Genus: Thallomys
 Acacia rat, Thallomys paedulcus LC
Genus: Thamnomys
 Kemp's thicket rat, Thamnomys kempi VU
 Charming thicket rat, Thamnomys venustus NT
Genus: Zelotomys
 Hildegarde's broad-headed mouse, Zelotomys hildegardeae LC

Order: Lagomorpha (lagomorphs) 
The lagomorphs comprise two families, Leporidae (hares and rabbits), and Ochotonidae (pikas). Though they can resemble rodents, and were classified as a superfamily in that order until the early 20th century, they have since been considered a separate order. They differ from rodents in a number of physical characteristics, such as having four incisors in the upper jaw rather than two.

Family: Leporidae (rabbits, hares)
Genus: Poelagus
 Bunyoro rabbit, Poelagus marjorita LR/lc
Genus: Lepus
 African savanna hare, Lepus microtis LR/lc

Order: Soricomorpha (shrews, moles, and solenodons) 
The "shrew-forms" are insectivorous mammals. The shrews and solenodons closely resemble mice while the moles are stout-bodied burrowers.

Family: Soricidae (shrews)
Subfamily: Crocidurinae
Genus: Crocidura
 Hun shrew, Crocidura attila LC
 African dusky shrew, Crocidura caliginea LC
 Greater Congo shrew, Crocidura polli LC
 Long-footed shrew, Crocidura crenata LC
 Reddish-gray musk shrew, Crocidura cyanea LC
 Dent's shrew, Crocidura denti LC
 Long-tailed musk shrew, Crocidura dolichura LC
 Savanna shrew, Crocidura fulvastra LC
 Bicolored musk shrew, Crocidura fuscomurina LC
 Goliath shrew, Crocidura goliath LC
 Hildegarde's shrew, Crocidura hildegardeae LC
 Lesser red musk shrew, Crocidura hirta LC
 Jackson's shrew, Crocidura jacksoni LC
 Kivu shrew, Crocidura kivuana VU
 Kivu long-haired shrew, Crocidura lanosa VU
 Latona's shrew, Crocidura latona LC
 Butiaba naked-tailed shrew, Crocidura littoralis LC
 Ludia's shrew, Crocidura ludia LC
 Moonshine shrew, Crocidura luna LC
 Swamp musk shrew, Crocidura mariquensis LC
 African black shrew, Crocidura nigrofusca LC
 Niobe's shrew, Crocidura niobe LC
 African giant shrew, Crocidura olivieri LC
 Small-footed shrew, Crocidura parvipes LC
 Flat-headed shrew, Crocidura planiceps DD
 Polia's shrew, Crocidura polia DD
 Roosevelt's shrew, Crocidura roosevelti LC
 Kahuzi swamp shrew, Crocidura stenocephala VU
 Tarella shrew, Crocidura tarella VU
 Turbo shrew, Crocidura turba LC
 Upemba shrew, Crocidura zimmeri DD
Genus: Paracrocidura
 Grauer's large-headed shrew, Paracrocidura graueri DD
 Greater large-headed shrew, Paracrocidura maxima NT
 Lesser large-headed shrew, Paracrocidura schoutedeni LC
Genus: Ruwenzorisorex
 Ruwenzori shrew, Ruwenzorisorex suncoides VU
Genus: Scutisorex
 Armored shrew, Scutisorex somereni LC
Genus: Suncus
 Least dwarf shrew, Suncus infinitesimus LC
 Greater dwarf shrew, Suncus lixus LC
 Lesser dwarf shrew, Suncus varilla LC
Genus: Sylvisorex
 Grant's forest shrew, Sylvisorex granti LC
 Johnston's forest shrew, Sylvisorex johnstoni LC
 Climbing shrew, Sylvisorex megalura LC
 Lesser forest shrew, Sylvisorex oriundus DD
 Volcano shrew, Sylvisorex vulcanorum LC
Subfamily: Myosoricinae
Genus: Congosorex
 Greater Congo shrew, Congosorex polli DD
Genus: Myosorex
 Babault's mouse shrew, Myosorex babaulti VU
 Schaller's mouse shrew, Myosorex schalleri DD

Order: Chiroptera (bats) 
The bats' most distinguishing feature is that their forelimbs are developed as wings, making them the only mammals capable of flight. Bat species account for about 20% of all mammals.
Family: Pteropodidae (flying foxes, Old World fruit bats)
Subfamily: Pteropodinae
Genus: Casinycteris
 Short-palated fruit bat, Casinycteris argynnis NT
Genus: Eidolon
 Straw-coloured fruit bat, Eidolon helvum LC
Genus: Epomophorus
 Peters's epauletted fruit bat, Epomophorus crypturus LC
 Gambian epauletted fruit bat, Epomophorus gambianus LC
 Ethiopian epauletted fruit bat, Epomophorus labiatus LC
 Wahlberg's epauletted fruit bat, Epomophorus wahlbergi LC
Genus: Epomops
 Dobson's epauletted fruit bat, Epomops dobsoni LC
 Franquet's epauletted fruit bat, Epomops franqueti LC
Genus: Hypsignathus
 Hammer-headed bat, Hypsignathus monstrosus LC
Genus: Lissonycteris
 Angolan rousette, Lissonycteris angolensis LC
Genus: Micropteropus
 Hayman's dwarf epauletted fruit bat, Micropteropus intermedius DD
 Peters's dwarf epauletted fruit bat, Micropteropus pusillus LC
Genus: Myonycteris
 Little collared fruit bat, Myonycteris torquata LC
Genus: Plerotes
 D'Anchieta's fruit bat, Plerotes anchietae DD
Genus: Rousettus
 Egyptian fruit bat, Rousettus aegyptiacus LC
 Long-haired rousette, Rousettus lanosus LC
Genus: Scotonycteris
 Zenker's fruit bat, Scotonycteris zenkeri NT
Subfamily: Macroglossinae
Genus: Megaloglossus
 Woermann's bat, Megaloglossus woermanni LC
Family: Vespertilionidae
Subfamily: Kerivoulinae
Genus: Kerivoula
 Damara woolly bat, Kerivoula argentata LC
 Copper woolly bat, Kerivoula cuprosa NT
 Lesser woolly bat, Kerivoula lanosa LC
 Spurrell's woolly bat, Kerivoula phalaena NT
 Smith's woolly bat, Kerivoula smithi LC
Subfamily: Myotinae
Genus: Myotis
 Rufous mouse-eared bat, Myotis bocagii LC
 Cape hairy bat, Myotis tricolor LC
 Welwitsch's bat, Myotis welwitschii LC
Subfamily: Vespertilioninae
Genus: Glauconycteris
 Allen's striped bat, Glauconycteris alboguttata DD
 Silvered bat, Glauconycteris argentata LC
 Beatrix's bat, Glauconycteris beatrix NT
 Curry's bat, Glauconycteris curryae DD
 Allen's spotted bat, Glauconycteris humeralis DD
 Abo bat, Glauconycteris poensis LC
 Pied bat, Glauconycteris superba VU
 Butterfly bat, Glauconycteris variegata LC
Genus: Hypsugo
 Anchieta's pipistrelle, Hypsugo anchietae LC
 Broad-headed pipistrelle, Hypsugo crassulus LC
 Eisentraut's pipistrelle, Hypsugo eisentrauti DD
 Mouselike pipistrelle, Hypsugo musciculus DD
Genus: Laephotis
 Angolan long-eared bat, Laephotis angolensis NT
 Botswanan long-eared bat, Laephotis botswanae LC
Genus: Mimetillus
 Moloney's mimic bat, Mimetillus moloneyi LC
Genus: Neoromicia
 Dark-brown serotine, Neoromicia brunneus NT
 Cape serotine, Neoromicia capensis LC
 Tiny serotine, Neoromicia guineensis LC
 Melck's house bat, Neoromicia melckorum DD
 Banana pipistrelle, Neoromicia nanus LC
 Rendall's serotine, Neoromicia rendalli LC
 Somali serotine, Neoromicia somalicus LC
 White-winged serotine, Neoromicia tenuipinnis LC
 Zulu serotine, Neoromicia zuluensis LC
Genus: Nycticeinops
 Schlieffen's bat, Nycticeinops schlieffeni LC
Genus: Pipistrellus
 Tiny pipistrelle, Pipistrellus nanulus LC
 Rüppell's pipistrelle, Pipistrellus rueppelli LC
Genus: Scotoecus
 Light-winged lesser house bat, Scotoecus albofuscus DD
 Dark-winged lesser house bat, Scotoecus hirundo DD
Genus: Scotophilus
 African yellow bat, Scotophilus dinganii LC
 Schreber's yellow bat, Scotophilus nigrita NT
 Nut-colored yellow bat, Scotophilus nux LC
Subfamily: Miniopterinae
Genus: Miniopterus
 Lesser long-fingered bat, Miniopterus fraterculus LC
 Greater long-fingered bat, Miniopterus inflatus LC
 Least long-fingered bat, Miniopterus minor NT
 Natal long-fingered bat, Miniopterus natalensis NT
Family: Molossidae
Genus: Chaerephon
 Duke of Abruzzi's free-tailed bat, Chaerephon aloysiisabaudiae NT
 Ansorge's free-tailed bat, Chaerephon ansorgei LC
 Gland-tailed free-tailed bat, Chaerephon bemmeleni LC
 Chapin's free-tailed bat, Chaerephon chapini DD
 Gallagher's free-tailed bat, Chaerephon gallagheri CR
 Lappet-eared free-tailed bat, Chaerephon major LC
 Nigerian free-tailed bat, Chaerephon nigeriae LC
 Little free-tailed bat, Chaerephon pumila LC
 Russet free-tailed bat, Chaerephon russata NT
 Chapin's free-tailed bat, Chaerephon shortridgei NT
Genus: Mops
 Sierra Leone free-tailed bat, Mops brachypterus LC
 Angolan free-tailed bat, Mops condylurus LC
 Medje free-tailed bat, Mops congicus NT
 Mongalla free-tailed bat, Mops demonstrator NT
 Midas free-tailed bat, Mops midas LC
 Dwarf free-tailed bat, Mops nanulus LC
 Niangara free-tailed bat, Mops niangarae DD
 White-bellied free-tailed bat, Mops niveiventer LC
 Railer bat, Mops thersites LC
 Trevor's free-tailed bat, Mops trevori VU
Genus: Myopterus
 Daubenton's free-tailed bat, Myopterus daubentonii NT
 Bini free-tailed bat, Myopterus whitleyi LC
Genus: Otomops
 Large-eared free-tailed bat, Otomops martiensseni NT
Genus: Tadarida
 Egyptian free-tailed bat, Tadarida aegyptiaca LC
 Madagascan large free-tailed bat, Tadarida fulminans LC
 African giant free-tailed bat, Tadarida ventralis NT
Family: Emballonuridae
Genus: Coleura
 African sheath-tailed bat, Coleura afra LC
Genus: Saccolaimus
 Pel's pouched bat, Saccolaimus peli NT
Genus: Taphozous
 Mauritian tomb bat, Taphozous mauritianus LC
 Naked-rumped tomb bat, Taphozous nudiventris LC
 Egyptian tomb bat, Taphozous perforatus LC
Family: Nycteridae
Genus: Nycteris
 Bate's slit-faced bat, Nycteris arge LC
 Large slit-faced bat, Nycteris grandis LC
 Hairy slit-faced bat, Nycteris hispida LC
 Intermediate slit-faced bat, Nycteris intermedia NT
 Large-eared slit-faced bat, Nycteris macrotis LC
 Ja slit-faced bat, Nycteris major VU
 Dwarf slit-faced bat, Nycteris nana LC
 Egyptian slit-faced bat, Nycteris thebaica LC
Family: Megadermatidae
Genus: Lavia
 Yellow-winged bat, Lavia frons LC
Family: Rhinolophidae
Subfamily: Rhinolophinae
Genus: Rhinolophus
 Halcyon horseshoe bat, Rhinolophus alcyone LC
Blasius's horseshoe bat, R. blasii 
 Geoffroy's horseshoe bat, Rhinolophus clivosus LC
 Darling's horseshoe bat, Rhinolophus darlingi LC
 Rüppell's horseshoe bat, Rhinolophus fumigatus LC
 Hildebrandt's horseshoe bat, Rhinolophus hildebrandti LC
 Lander's horseshoe bat, Rhinolophus landeri LC
 Ruwenzori horseshoe bat, Rhinolophus ruwenzorii VU
Subfamily: Hipposiderinae
Genus: Cloeotis
 Percival's trident bat, Cloeotis percivali VU
Genus: Hipposideros
 Aba roundleaf bat, Hipposideros abae NT
 Benito roundleaf bat, Hipposideros beatus LC
 Sundevall's roundleaf bat, Hipposideros caffer LC
 Greater roundleaf bat, Hipposideros camerunensis DD
 Cyclops roundleaf bat, Hipposideros cyclops LC
 Sooty roundleaf bat, Hipposideros fuliginosus NT
 Giant roundleaf bat, Hipposideros gigas LC
 Commerson's roundleaf bat, Hipposideros marungensis NT
 Noack's roundleaf bat, Hipposideros ruber LC
Genus: Triaenops
 Persian trident bat, Triaenops persicus LC

Order: Pholidota (pangolins) 
The order Pholidota comprises the eight species of pangolin. Pangolins are anteaters and have the powerful claws, elongated snout and long tongue seen in the other unrelated anteater species.

Family: Manidae
Genus: Manis
 Giant pangolin, Manis gigantea LR/lc
 Ground pangolin, Manis temminckii LR/nt
 Long-tailed pangolin, Manis tetradactyla LR/lc
 Tree pangolin, Manis tricuspis LR/lc

Order: Cetacea (whales) 
The order Cetacea includes whales, dolphins and porpoises. They are the mammals most fully adapted to aquatic life with a spindle-shaped nearly hairless body, protected by a thick layer of blubber, and forelimbs and tail modified to provide propulsion underwater.

Suborder: Mysticeti
Family: Balaenopteridae
Subfamily: Megapterinae
Genus: Megaptera
 Humpback whale, Megaptera novaeangliae LC (possibly not as abundant as other populations)
Subfamily: Balaenopterinae
Genus: Balaenoptera
 Southern blue whale, Balaenoptera m. musculus intermedia EN (formerly in large numbers)
 Southern fin whale, Balaenoptera physalus quoyi EN
 Southern sei whale, Balaenoptera borealis schlegelii EN
 Bryde's whale, Balaenoptera edeni DD
 Antarctic minke whale, Balaenoptera bonaerensis DD
 Common minke whale, Balaenoptera acutorostrata LR/nt
Suborder: Odontoceti
Family: Physeteridae
Genus: Physeter
 Sperm whale, Physeter macrocephalus VU
Superfamily: Platanistoidea
Family: Kogiidae
Genus: Kogia
 Pygmy sperm whale, Kogia breviceps DD
 Dwarf sperm whale, Kogia sima DD
Family: Delphinidae (marine dolphins)
Genus: Stenella
 Pantropical spotted dolphin, Stenella attenuata DD
 Clymene dolphin, Stenella clymene DD
 Striped dolphin, Stenella coeruleoalba DD
 Atlantic spotted dolphin, Stenella frontalis DD
 Spinner dolphin, Stenella longirostris DD
Genus: Steno
 Rough-toothed dolphin, Steno bredanensis DD
Genus: Sousa
 Atlantic humpback dolphin, Sousa teuszii NT (now rare)
Genus: Tursiops
 Common bottlenose dolphin, Tursiops truncatus DD
Genus: Lagenodelphis
 Fraser's dolphin, Lagenodelphis hosei DD
Genus: Feresa
 Pygmy killer whale, Feresa attenuata DD
Genus: Pseudorca
 False killer whale, Pseudorca crassidens DD
Genus: Globicephala
 Short-finned pilot whale, Globicephala macrorhynchus DD
Genus: Orcinus
 Orca, Orcinus orca DD
Genus: Peponocephala
 Melon-headed whale, Peponocephala electra DD
Family: Ziphidae
Genus: Mesoplodon
 Blainville's beaked whale, Mesoplodon densirostris DD
Genus: Ziphius
 Cuvier's beaked whale, Ziphius cavirostris DD

Order: Carnivora (carnivorans) 

There are over 260 species of carnivorans, the majority of which feed primarily on meat. They have a characteristic skull shape and dentition.
Suborder: Feliformia
Family: Felidae (cats)
Subfamily: Felinae
Genus: Caracal
 Caracal, C. caracal 
African golden cat, C. aurata 
Genus: Leptailurus
Serval, L. serval 
Subfamily: Pantherinae
Genus: Panthera
Lion, P. leo 
Leopard, P. pardus 
Family: Viverridae
Subfamily: Viverrinae
Genus: Civettictis
 African civet, C. civetta 
Genus: Genetta
 Angolan genet, G. angolensis 
 Rusty-spotted genet, G. maculata 
 Servaline genet, G. servalina 
 Giant forest genet, G. victoriae 
Genus: Osbornictis
 Aquatic genet, O. piscivora NT
Genus: Poiana
 Central African oyan, P. richardsonii 
Family: Nandiniidae
Genus: Nandinia
 African palm civet, N. binotata 
Family: Herpestidae (mongooses)
Genus: Atilax
 Marsh mongoose, A. paludinosus 
Genus: Bdeogale
Bushy-tailed mongoose, B. crassicauda 
 Black-footed mongoose, B. nigripes 
Genus: Crossarchus
 Alexander's kusimanse, C. alexandri 
 Angolan kusimanse, C. ansorgei 
Genus: Dologale
 Pousargues's mongoose, D. dybowskii 
Genus: Helogale
 Common dwarf mongoose, Helogale parvula 
Genus: Herpestes
 Egyptian mongoose, H. ichneumon 
Common slender mongoose, H. sanguineus 
Genus: Ichneumia
White-tailed mongoose, I. albicauda 
Genus: Mungos
 Banded mongoose, M. mungo 
Genus: Rhynchogale
 Meller's mongoose, R. melleri 
Genus: Xenogale
Long-nosed mongoose, X. naso 
Family: Hyaenidae (hyaenas)
Genus: Crocuta
 Spotted hyena, Crocuta crocuta 
Suborder: Caniformia
Family: Canidae (dogs, foxes)
Genus: Lupulella
 Side-striped jackal, L. adusta  
Genus: Lycaon
 African wild dog, L. pictus  possibly extirpated
Family: Mustelidae (mustelids)
Genus: Ictonyx
 Striped polecat, Ictonyx striatus 
Genus: Poecilogale
 African striped weasel, P. albinucha 
Genus: Mellivora
 Honey badger, M. capensis 
Genus: Lutra
 Speckle-throated otter, L. maculicollis 
Genus: Aonyx
 African clawless otter, A. capensis

Order: Perissodactyla (odd-toed ungulates) 
The odd-toed ungulates are browsing and grazing mammals. They are usually large to very large, and have relatively simple stomachs and a large middle toe.

Family: Equidae (horses etc.)
Genus: Equus
 Plains zebra, E. quagga 
 Grant's zebra, E. q. boehmi 
Family: Rhinocerotidae
Genus: Ceratotherium
 White rhinoceros, C. simum  extirpated
 Northern white rhinoceros, C. s. cottoni , possibly extirpated

Order: Artiodactyla (even-toed ungulates) 

The even-toed ungulates are ungulates whose weight is borne about equally by the third and fourth toes, rather than mostly or entirely by the third as in perissodactyls. There are about 220 artiodactyl species, including many that are of great economic importance to humans.
Family: Suidae (pigs)
Subfamily: Phacochoerinae
Genus: Phacochoerus
 Common warthog, Phacochoerus africanus
Subfamily: Suinae
Genus: Hylochoerus
 Giant forest hog, Hylochoerus meinertzhageni
Genus: Potamochoerus
 Bushpig, Potamochoerus larvatus
 Red river hog, Potamochoerus porcus
Family: Hippopotamidae (hippopotamuses)
Genus: Hippopotamus
Hippopotamus, H. amphibius 
Family: Tragulidae
Genus: Hyemoschus
 Water chevrotain, Hyemoschus aquaticus DD
Family: Giraffidae (giraffe, okapi)
Genus: Giraffa
 Kordofan giraffe, Giraffa camelopardalis antiquorum EN
 Nubian giraffe, Giraffa camelopardalis camelopardalis EN
 Masai giraffe, Giraffa tippelskirchi VU
Genus: Okapia
 Okapi, Okapia johnstoni LR/nt
Family: Bovidae (cattle, antelope, sheep, goats)
Subfamily: Alcelaphinae
Genus: Alcelaphus
 Hartebeest, Alcelaphus buselaphus LR/cd
 Lichtenstein's hartebeest, Alcelaphus lichtensteinii LR/cd
Genus: Damaliscus
 Topi, Damaliscus lunatus LR/cd
Subfamily: Antilopinae
Genus: Neotragus
 Bates's pygmy antelope, Neotragus batesi LR/nt
Genus: Oreotragus
 Klipspringer, Oreotragus oreotragus LR/cd
Genus: Ourebia
 Oribi, Ourebia ourebi LR/cd
Genus: Raphicerus
 Sharpe's grysbok, Raphicerus sharpei LR/cd
Subfamily: Bovinae
Genus: Syncerus
 African buffalo, Syncerus caffer LR/cd
Genus: Tragelaphus
 Giant eland, Tragelaphus derbianus LR/nt
 Bongo, Tragelaphus eurycerus LR/nt
 Common eland, Tragelaphus oryx LR/cd
 Bushbuck, Tragelaphus scriptus LR/lc
 Sitatunga, Tragelaphus spekii LR/nt
 Greater kudu, Tragelaphus strepsiceros LR/cd
Subfamily: Cephalophinae
Genus: Cephalophus
 Peters's duiker, Cephalophus callipygus LR/nt
 Bay duiker, Cephalophus dorsalis LR/nt
 White-bellied duiker, Cephalophus leucogaster LR/nt
 Blue duiker, Cephalophus monticola LR/lc
 Black-fronted duiker, Cephalophus nigrifrons LR/nt
 Red-flanked duiker, Cephalophus rufilatus LR/cd
 Yellow-backed duiker, Cephalophus silvicultor LR/nt
 Weyns's duiker, Cephalophus weynsi LR/nt
Genus: Sylvicapra
 Common duiker, Sylvicapra grimmia LR/lc
Subfamily: Hippotraginae
Genus: Hippotragus
 Roan antelope, Hippotragus equinus LR/cd
 Sable antelope, Hippotragus niger LR/cd
Subfamily: Aepycerotinae
Genus: Aepyceros
 Impala, Aepyceros melampus LR/cd
Subfamily: Reduncinae
Genus: Kobus
 Waterbuck, Kobus ellipsiprymnus LR/cd
 Kob, Kobus kob LR/cd
 Lechwe, Kobus leche LR/cd
 Puku, Kobus vardonii LR/cd
Genus: Redunca
 Southern reedbuck, Redunca arundinum LR/cd
 Bohor reedbuck, Redunca redunca LR/cd

References

External links

See also
List of chordate orders
Lists of mammals by region
List of prehistoric mammals
Mammal classification
List of mammals described in the 2000s
List of amphibians of the Democratic Republic of the Congo
List of birds of the Democratic Republic of the Congo

Congo, Democratic Republic
Congo, Democratic Republic
Mammals